This is a list of officers who commanded the Regular Troops of the British Army in Canada until 1906, when the last British garrison was withdrawn.

From 1875 there was a separate commander of the Canadian Militia. This officer was responsible to the Dominion government and was the predecessor of the present Commander of the Canadian Army.

Commanders
Lieutenant-General on the Staff, commanding the Troops in North America
 1849–1855: Lieutenant-General William Rowan CB
 1855–1856: Major-General John Home Home, acting
 1856–1859: Lieutenant-General Sir William Eyre KCB
 1859–1865: Lieutenant-General Sir William Fenwick Williams Bt KCB

Lieutenant-General on the Staff, commanding the Troops in Canada
 1865–1867: Lieutenant-General Sir John Michel GCB
 1867–1870: Lieutenant-General Sir Charles Ash Windham KCB
 February–March 1870: Major-General Sir Charles Hastings Doyle KCMG, acting
 March–September 1870: Lieutenant-General the Hon. James Alexander Lindsay, employed on a particular service to oversee the reduction of British troops
 1870–1873: Lieutenant-General Sir Charles Hastings Doyle KCMG, resumed
 1873–1878: General Sir William O'Grady Haly KCB
 1878–1883: General Sir Patrick Leonard MacDougall KCMG
 1883–1888: General Lord Alexander George Russell CB
 1888–1893: General Sir John Ross GCB
 1893–1898: General Alexander George Montgomery Moore
 1898–1901: Lieutenant-General Lord William Frederick Ernest Seymour

Colonel on the Staff, commanding the Troops in Canada
 1902–1906: Major-General Sir Charles Sim Bremridge Parsons KCMG

References
 Hart's Army List 1850–1908

Military of Canada
Senior appointments of the British Army